Leśnik may refer to:

Leśnik, Międzychód County in Greater Poland Voivodeship (west-central Poland)
Leśnik, Kuyavian-Pomeranian Voivodeship (north-central Poland)
Leśnik, Łódź Voivodeship (central Poland)
Leśnik, Złotów County in Greater Poland Voivodeship (west-central Poland)
Leśnik, Opole Voivodeship (south-west Poland)
Leśnik, Pomeranian Voivodeship (north Poland)